Higanbana may refer to:
Lycoris radiata, a plant in the amaryllis family Amaryllidaceae, also known as a red spider lily

Media
Equinox Flower (originally titled Higanbana), a 1958 Japanese film
Higanbana (album), a 2007 studio album by Merzbow
Higanbana no Saku Yoru ni, a manga and visual novel series